Born to Be Heiled is the sixth full-length album by American industrial metal band Hanzel und Gretyl. It was released via Metropolis Records on November 27, 2012.

Track listing

Personnel 
 Kaizer von Loopy – vocals, guitar, programming
 Vas Kallas – lead vocals, bass

External links 
Official Hanzel und Gretyl website
Official MySpace page
Metropolis Records

Hanzel und Gretyl albums
2012 albums
German-language albums
Metropolis Records albums